Mallick Tower is a multi-tenant office building located at 101 Summit Ave in Fort Worth, Texas. Built in 1968, Mallick Tower was the first highrise in downtown Fort Worth west of Henderson Street.

History and Opening 
The tower was conceived and built by George A. Mallick, Jr. (b.1934 – d. 1999), a successful Fort Worth real estate developer. The lavish opening party that year included the arrival of Congressman Jim Wright to the party by helicopter. The relationship between the two men would later be investigated in the Federal ethics review of Congressman Wright over money given to him by Mr. Mallick. The investigation began in 1988 and concluded with the resignation of the then Speaker of the House of Representatives in 1989. Mr. Mallick continued to develop other large multi-tenant residential and commercial projects around the Fort Worth area prior to his death in 1999. He is buried in Greenwood Memorial Park and Mausoleum in Fort Worth, TX.

2000 Tornado 
The building was one of the downtown high-rises that bore the brunt of the 2000 tornado which destroyed much of downtown Ft Worth. The building sustained near complete damage of the south and west facing sides of the building and sustained a large amount of internal water and wind damage. The building was rebuilt and renovated the following year as well as in 2009.

Heliport 

References 

Buildings and structures in Fort Worth, Texas
Buildings and structures completed in 1968
Heliports in the United States
Office buildings in Fort Worth, Texas